The term Disco Volante (Italian for flying disc or flying saucer) may refer to;

 Disco Volante (Mr. Bungle album), a 1995 album by the band Mr. Bungle
 Disco Volante (Lisa album), a 2009 album by singer Lisa
 Disco Volante, a 2000 album by the band Cinerama
 Disco Volante (ship), a ship in the Ian Fleming novel Thunderball
 Il disco volante, a 1964 Italian science fiction comedy

See also 
 Alfa Romeo Disco Volante, a series of experimental sports racing cars
 Alfa Romeo Disco Volante by Touring